Count Anton Magnus Herman Wrangel af Sauss (13 August 1857 – 9 October 1934) was a Swedish diplomat. He served as Envoy Extraordinary and Minister Plenipotentiary of the King of Sweden at the Court of St James' between 1906 and 1920 and as Minister for Foreign Affairs in the cabinets of Louis De Geer and Oscar von Sydow between 1920 and 1921.

Life and work 
Herman Wrangel was born, into the Wrangel family, at Salsta Palace in Uppland, Sweden, the son of Count Fredrik Ulrik Wrangel af Sauss and the Countess Ulrika Ebba Vilhelmina Sprengtporten.

Wrangel was attache at the Ministry for Foreign Affairs, serving in Copenhagen and Paris 1884. He was made second secretary at the Ministry for Foreign Affairs 1885, chamberlain and acting vice master of ceremonies 1887, first secretary at the Ministry for Foreign Affairs 1889, acting secretary of the Swedish legation in Paris 1890–1896 and then secretary in Paris 1896–1900, Envoy Extraordinary and Minister Plenipotentiary at Brussels and The Hague 1900, at Saint Petersburg 1904, and at London 1906.  Minister for Foreign Affairs 1920–1921.

Accompanied King Oscar II on several of his travels abroad. Was secretary of the Swedish-Norwegian delegation at the International Factory and Mine Labour Conference in Berlin 1890 and envoy of Sweden at the Paris Peace Conference in 1919.

He married in 1893 in Bordeaux, France, Louise Charlotte Suzanne Baour (1869–1940) the daughter of Charles Baour and Marguerite Guestier. Their son Oskar Fredrik Ulrik Louis Wrangel af Sauss was born in Paris on 23 January 1895, and died unmarried at the age of 32 at Chateau de Villambis in France on 9 January 1928.

Ancestry

References

1857 births
1934 deaths
Ambassadors of Sweden to the United Kingdom
Commanders Grand Cross of the Order of the Polar Star
Honorary Knights Grand Cross of the Royal Victorian Order
Swedish Ministers for Foreign Affairs
Swedish counts
Herman
Swedish people of Baltic German descent